Filipe Miguel Barros Soares (born 20 May 1999) is a Portuguese professional footballer who plays for Super League Greece club PAOK FC as a central or attacking midfielder.

Club career

Benfica
Born in Lisbon, Soares joined S.L. Benfica's youth academy in at the age of 8. On 19 February 2017, still a junior, he made his senior debut with the reserve team, coming on as a late substitute in a 2–1 home win against S.C. Freamunde for the LigaPro.

Estoril and Moreirense
In July 2018, Soares signed with G.D. Estoril Praia also of the second division. He moved to the Primeira Liga one year later, agreeing to a five-year contract at Moreirense FC.

Soares played his first match in the Portuguese top flight on 11 August 2019, featuring 28 minutes in the 3–1 away loss to S.C. Braga before being stretchered off with an injury. He scored his first and second goals in the competition the following 2 February, in a 5–1 away victory over Gil Vicente FC.

During his spell at the Parque de Jogos Comendador Joaquim de Almeida Freitas, Soares totalled 85 games, six goals and seven assists.

PAOK
On 25 January 2022, Soares joined Super League Greece club PAOK FC for €2.5 million, on a deal running until June 2026.

International career
Soares won his first cap for the Portugal under-21 side on 5 September 2019, playing the second half of a 4–0 home win against Gibraltar for the 2021 UEFA European Championship qualifiers after replacing Sporting CP's Miguel Luís.

Personal life
Soares' older brother, Alexandre, is also a footballer and a midfielder.

Career statistics

Club

References

External links

1999 births
Living people
Portuguese footballers
Footballers from Lisbon
Association football midfielders
Primeira Liga players
Liga Portugal 2 players
S.L. Benfica B players
G.D. Estoril Praia players
Moreirense F.C. players
Super League Greece players
PAOK FC players
Portugal youth international footballers
Portugal under-21 international footballers
Portuguese expatriate footballers
Expatriate footballers in Greece
Portuguese expatriate sportspeople in Greece